Veliky Dvor is a rural locality (a village) in Gorodishchenskoye Rural Settlement, Nyuksensky District, Vologda Oblast, Russia. The population was 44 as of 2002.

Geography 
Veliky Dvor is located 41 km southeast of Nyuksenitsa (the district's administrative centre) by road. Yushkovo is the nearest rural locality.

References 

Rural localities in Nyuksensky District